Pirola may refer to:

 Pyrola, a genus of evergreen herbaceous plants in the family Ericaceae  
 Pirola (surname), Italian surnames
 1082 Pirola, a dark Themistian asteroid from the outer regions of the asteroid belt